Si*Sé is the self-titled debut album by Si*Sé.

Band Review from http://www.luakabop.com/sise/info.html:

"Formed two years ago by singer Carol C and programmer/DJ U.F.LOW, Si*Sé bring together the atmospheric vibes of electronica with the crackle of live instruments. The results are electric: "It’s about mixing stuff up that’s not usually mixed together," says Carol C.
"We’re a band from New York City and we try and combine all of its musical traditions including hip-hop beats, Latin rhythms and down-tempo electronic music because that’s what we hear everyday of our lives. It’s a prelude to the future."

Track listing
"Slip Away" - 4:16
"The Rain (Where do I begin)" - 4:33 (Cover of "Rain" by Oran "Juice" Jones )
"My Sol" - 3:18
"Bizcocho Amargo" - 4:19
"Steppin' Out" - 3:20
"Burbuja" - 3:43
"Aire" - 6:13
"Beyond Outside" - 4:47
"Dolemite" - 5:33
"Cuando" - 4:30
"Sonrisa" - 4:40
"I Want You To..." - 6:03
"Lullaby" - 0:35

Production notes
 Carol C.: Vocals & Lyrics
 U.F. Low: Keys & Programming
 Ryan Farley: Drums
 Morgan Phillips: Bass
 Jeannie Oliver: Strings
 Mike Tuosto, Mike Mangini and Zeb (The Spy from Cairo): Guitars
 Gordon "Nappy G" Clay: Percussion
 Produced by U.F. Low & Carol C
 Recorded by Mike Mangini & Mike Tuosto
 Engineered by Mike Mangini
 Illustrations by Kimou Meyer

2001 debut albums
Luaka Bop albums
Si*Sé albums
Albums produced by David Byrne